Colladon is a surname. Notable people with the surname include:

 Jean-Daniel Colladon (1802–1893), Swiss physicist
 Louis Théodore Frederic Colladon (1792–1862), Swiss physician and botanist
 Nicolas Colladon ( 1530–1586), French Calvinist pastor